Anoxomer is a food additive with E number E323.  It is a non-digestible polymeric antioxidant.  It was designed to allow the introduction of established antioxidants in a non-absorbable manner in order to avoid potential health risk associated with their digestion.

Anoxomer is prepared by condensation polymerization of divinylbenzene and a mixture of antioxidant monomers including tert-butylhydroquinone, tert-butylphenol, hydroxyanisole, p-cresol and 4,4'-isopropylidenediphenol.

References

Food antioxidants
Organic polymers